USS Pennewill (DE-175) was a  built for the United States Navy during World War II.  She served in the Atlantic Ocean and provided escort service against submarine and air attack for Navy vessels and convoys.

Namesake
William Ellison Pennewill was born on 20 February 1907 in Dover, Delaware. He was appointed midshipman on 18 June 1925. He was commissioned ensign on 6 June 1931 and reported for duty under instruction in flying, at the Naval Air Station Pensacola, Florida. His next duty was in Salt Lake City, then with Scouting Squadron 10–S, aboard . On 7 March 1932 he reported for duty with the Aircraft Scouting Force until 2 June 1934, when he was transferred to Bombing Squadron 3–B, aboard . He returned to the Naval Air Station, Pensacola and on 2 August 1941 joined the 16th Bombardment Wing. After serving at the Savannah Air Base, Savannah, Georgia, until 6 March 1942, he was assigned duty involving flying in connection with the fitting out of Escort Scouting Squadron Twelve.

On 29 May 1942, as lieutenant commander, he was in command of the squadron and while serving in this capacity, was killed, 23 June 1942, as a result of an airplane crash, while on duty at the Naval Air Station Kodiak, Alaska. He was posthumously awarded the Distinguished Flying Cross.

Construction and commissioning
The ship was laid down on 26 April 1943 by the Federal Shipbuilding and Dry Dock Co., Newark, New Jersey; launched on 8 August 1943; sponsored by Mrs. Lucie Reilly Pennewill; and commissioned on 15 September 1943.

World War II Central and South Atlantic operations

After shakedown, Pennewill steamed to Trinidad, British West Indies, for convoy escort duty. On 20 November 1943, she departed Trinidad as part of the escort for Convoy TJ–15, arriving Recife, Brazil, on 5 December.
 
Pennewill was engaged in operations with Task Group 42.2 from December 1943 to April 1944, escorting convoys from Trinidad to Recife, Brazil, and return. She also completed several special missions. From 25 to 27 December 1943 she escorted U.S. Army transport  from Trinidad to San Juan, Puerto Rico. From 21 to 22 January 1944, she was escort for British tanker  out of Recife to rendezvous with Task Group 41.4.
 
Pennewill arrived at Bahia, Brazil on 26 April.

Post-War Decommissioning 
On 28 July, she sailed from Recife to Natal, Brazil, where she decommissioned and was leased to the Government of Brazil on 1 August 1944. She was transferred to Brazil on 30 June 1953 and was struck from the Navy Directory on 20 July 1953. Her Brazilian name was Bertioga (D-21). She was scrapped in 1964.

References

External links

 
 

Cannon-class destroyer escorts of the United States Navy
Ships built in Kearny, New Jersey
1943 ships
World War II frigates and destroyer escorts of the United States
Bertioga-class destroyer escorts
Cannon-class destroyer escorts of the Brazilian Navy
World War II frigates of Brazil